Peter Alexis Boodberg (born Pyotr Alekseyevich Budberg; 8 April 1903 – 29 June 1972) was a Russian-American scholar, linguist, and sinologist who taught at the University of California, Berkeley for 40 years. Boodberg was influential in 20th century developments in the studies of the development of Chinese characters, Chinese philology, and Chinese historical phonology. He has been described as "one of the most original and commanding scholars" of the 20th century.

Life
Peter Alexis Boodberg was born "Pyotr Alekseyevich Budberg" (Pjotr Alekséjevič Búdberg) on 8 April 1903 in Vladivostok, Russia, which was then still a part of the Russian Empire. After Russia annexed Estonia in 1721, they became a prominent diplomatic and military family in Imperial Russia. Boodberg's father, Aleksei Pavlovich Budberg (1869–1945), was a baron and the commanding general of the Russian forces in Vladivostok. His father's position ensured that Boodberg enjoyed a strong education in the Latin and Greek Classics and in the major European languages. Budberg was a cadet at a military academy in St. Petersburg until the outbreak of World War I, when Budberg's parents sent him and his brother to Harbin, Manchuria, out of concern for their safety. Budberg attended the Oriental Institute (now Far Eastern Federal University) in Vladivostok, where he studied Chinese, which he had begun learning as a teenager in Harbin, and learned several other Asiatic languages.

The Budberg family fled Russia in 1920 due to the anti-aristocracy violence of the Bolshevik Revolution.  The family emigrated to the United States, changing their surname to Boodberg, and settled in San Francisco.  Boodberg enrolled as a student at the University of California, Berkeley, graduating with a B.A. in Oriental Languages in 1924.  Boodberg continued studying at Berkeley as a graduate student, earning a Ph.D. in Oriental Languages in 1930 with a dissertation entitled "The Art of War in Ancient China: A Study Based on the Dialogues of Li, Duke of Wei."

In 1932, Boodberg was hired to teach at Berkeley as an instructor in the Oriental Languages department.  He was made an associate professor in 1937, Chairman of the department in 1940, and was promoted to full professor in 1948.  Boodberg's scholarship won him Guggenheim Fellowships in 1938, 1956, and 1963.  In 1963, Boodberg also became President of the American Oriental Society.  He continued to teach until his death from a heart attack in 1972.  Boodberg influenced several generations of sinologists, notably Edward H. Schafer, who wrote a long obituary article in the Journal of the American Oriental Society that was followed by a full bibliography by Alvin P. Cohen.

Boodberg's only child, Xenia Boodberg Lee (1927–2004), was a concert pianist based in the San Francisco Bay area.

Selected works
Boodberg authored a large number of studies and manuscripts that he did not formally publish, instead simply circulating them primarily among his students and close colleagues.  Additionally, he destroyed several manuscripts related to philology and Chinese frontier history in the years prior to his death.  The following are some of his better known published works.

Boodberg, Peter A. (1930).  "The Art of War in Ancient China: A Study Based Upon the Dialogues of Li, Duke of Wei". Ph.D. dissertation (University of California, Berkeley).

See also
 List of Baltic German scientists

References 
Footnotes

Works cited

External links
University of California "In Memoriam" page, July 1975
Peter Boodberg and the ideographic myth

American sinologists
American Turkologists
Baltic German people from the Russian Empire
White Russian emigrants to the United States
1903 births
1972 deaths
UC Berkeley College of Letters and Science alumni
Far Eastern Federal University alumni
Writers from Vladivostok